Magalan Ugochukwu Awala (born June 20, 1990 in Kaduna) is a Nigerian football (soccer) player, who plays for Brothers Union in Bangladesh Premier League.

Career
Awala began his career with Moderate Stars Academy and joined 2008 to Israeli club, he was voted best player of the week in Israel league in July 2010 Hapoel Ironi Rishon LeZion. After two years with Hapoel Ironi Rishon LeZion joined to Liga Leumit club Hapoel Herzliya.

References

1990 births
Living people
Nigerian footballers
Nigerian expatriates in Israel
Association football forwards
Expatriate footballers in Israel
Hapoel Rishon LeZion F.C. players
Hapoel Herzliya F.C. players
Maccabi Ironi Bat Yam F.C. players
Sektzia Ness Ziona F.C. players
Beitar Tel Aviv Bat Yam F.C. players
Liga Leumit players
Sportspeople from Kaduna